This is a bibliography of major works about Ontario, Canada.

General
 The Dictionary of Canadian Biography (1966–2006): thousands of scholarly biographies of notables who died by 1930
 Canadian Encyclopedia (2008): reliable detailed encyclopedia, online free
 Celebrating One Thousand Years of Ontario's History: Proceedings of the Celebrating One Thousand Years of Ontario's History Symposium, April 14, 15, and 16, 2000. Ontario Historical Society, 2000. 343 pp.
 
  Baskerville, Peter A.  Sites of Power: A Concise History of Ontario. Oxford U. Press., 2005. 296 pp.  (first edition was Ontario: Image, Identity and Power, 2002). online review
 
 Chambers, Lori, and Edgar-Andre Montigny, eds. Ontario Since Confederation: A Reader (2000): articles by scholars
 Hall, Roger; Westfall, William; and MacDowell, Laurel Sefton, eds.  Patterns of the Past: Interpreting Ontario's History. Dundurn Pr., 1988. 406 pp.
 Mays, John Bentley.  Arrivals: Stories from the History of Ontario. Penguin Books Canada, 2002. 418 pp.
 Ruth Arndt (Spence). "Prohibition in Canada: A Memorial to Francis Stephens Spence. Ed. F. S. Spence". Toronto: Ontario Branch of the Dominion Alliance for the Total Suppression of the Liquor Traffic (1919), 105–138, 381–400. Examines the temperance movement and political platforms towards prohibition.
 Malcolm Bird. Bird, Malcolm G. "Alberta's and Ontario's Liquor Boards: Why such Divergent Outcomes?" Canadian Public Administration 53.4 (2010): 509-530. A case study between Ontario and Alberta regarding privatization of liquor. 
 
 Morris Fish. "The Effect of Alcohol on the Canadian Constitution ...Seriously." McGill Law Journal. 57.1 09; 2011: 189+. The author focuses on prohibition as a vital event that lead courts to be modernized.
 Gerald Hallowell. Prohibition in Ontario, 1919–1923. Ottawa, Love Printing Service, 1972: 3–18, 150–152. Mainly focuses on the election platforms of prohibition and was critical of the E.C Drury government.
 Murray Johnston. E.C. Drury: Agrarian Idealist. Toronto: University of Toronto Press, 1986: 1–4, 158–160, 196, 200–202. A biography of E.C Drury Premier of Ontario 1919–1923.
 Dan Malleck. Try to Control Yourself: The Regulation of Public Drinking in Post-Prohibition Ontario, 1927–44. Vancouver, BC: UBC Press, 2012: xv–xvi, 240–245. A book that analyzes the creation of the Liquor Control Board of Ontario. 
 Dan Malleck. "An Innovation from Across the Line: The American Drinker and Liquor Regulation in Two Ontario Border Communities, 1927–1944." Journal of Canadian Studies 41.1 (2007): 151–171. End of Prohibition in Ontario created a challenge for the relationship between the United States and Canada. 
 Peter Nesbitt. G. Howard Ferguson: Ontario Tory. Toronto: University of Toronto Press, 1977, 138–139, 158–60, 277–279. A biography of G. Howard Ferguson Premier of Ontario 1923–1930.
 Christina Blizzard. Right Turn: How the Tories Took Ontario Toronto: Dundurn Press, 1995.
 Monica Gattinger and Diane St Pierre. "The 'Neoliberal Turn' in Provincial Cultural Policy and Administration in Québec and Ontario: The Emergence of'Quasi-Neoliberal' Approaches." Canadian Journal of Communication. 35: 2 (June 29, 2010)
 Roger Keil. "'Common–Sense' Neoliberalism: Progressive Conservative Urbanism in Toronto, Canada." Antipode. 34: 3 (2002): 578–601.
 Sharon Anne Jaeger. From Control to Customer Service: Government Control of Liquor in Ontario, 1927–1972. ProQuest Dissertations and Theses, 2000. Examination of post-Prohibition alcohol policy in Ontario, and the inconsistent and often contradictory roles of the government's two alcohol-related organs, the Liquor Control Board of Ontario (LCBO) and the Liquor License Board of Ontario (LLBO). Explores impact of social movements and popular opinion upon legislative decision-making, as well as industry lobbying and broader social context. Argues that Ontario's incrementalist approach to policy-making was often challenged by the need for rapid change in alcohol policy, and examines the government's attempts to construct hasty compromises. Posits that the continued existence of the LCBO past the time when it was a large contributor to net general revenue indicates not only its importance as a patronage tool and means to appease powerful alcohol producers, but also represents a reflection of government's enduring belief that the restriction of market forces is permissible if it protects society.
 Lukin Robinson. "The Ontario Election and After." Monthly Review 47.9 (1996): 19. An analysis, from the perspective of a socialist, of the 1995 general election in Ontario and its impact on the economy and government. Focuses on the NDP's failings as an effective government leading to its downfall and the Conservative's victory. Critical of the approach to which the NDP and Liberals handled the election, and the Conservatives sweeping changes to social programs in pursuit of reducing provincial deficit.
 Maeve Quaid. Workfare: Why Good Social Policy Ideas Go Bad. Toronto: University of Toronto Press, 2002. An historical and comparative study of workfare as a social policy idea in the 1980s and 1990s. 
 Sid Noel. Essays on Governing Ontario: Revolution at Queen's Park. Toronto: James Lorimer & Company, 1997. A collection of essays and empirical studies examining the Ontario election in 1995. Discusses a variety of factors contributing to the Conservative victory including TV advertising campaigns, electoral behaviour, a change in Ontario's political culture, and economic and political history. Notes the appeal of fiscal accountability and platforms that cover a variety of areas of policy. 
 Bob Hebdon and Peter Warrian. "Coercive Bargaining: Public Sector Restructuring Under the Ontario Social Contract, 1993–1996." Industrial and Labor Relations Review 52.2 (1999): 196–212. An empirical study of the 1993 NDP government's Social Contract Act mandating spending reductions. Focuses on the approach to restructuring that the Social Contract takes paying particular attention to unionization and collective bargaining and cooperativeness between labour and management. Concludes by arguing that optimal restructuring outcomes were achieved when the collective concerns of workers were heard. Further states that majority of local unions and managers were able to find compromise under the Social Contract Act which was not the case when compared to Conservative restructuring causing prolonged strikes.
 Robert Drummond. "The Provincial Perspectives: Ontario." Canadian Annual Review of Politics and Public Affairs, 1995. Edited by David Leyton-Brown. Toronto: University of Toronto Press, 2002. An overview of the 1995 general election in Ontario and record of the Speech from the Throne as well as the first session of the 36th Ontario provincial parliament. Focuses on establishing the facts rather than an in depth analysis of the election; determines that the major issues of the election were welfare, tax and spending cuts, and employment equity. Notes that Conservative victory due to a platform with promises (unlike the NDP), no half measures (unlike the Liberals), the poor performance of the NDP incumbent government, a shrewd advertisement campaign, votes from Reform supporters,  and NDP and Liberals attacking one another rather than the Conservatives. Concludes with a record of the new government quickly fulfilling its campaign promises allowing it continued major public support and the introduction of an omnibus bill proposing amendments to approximately 40 statutes. Such amendments included allowing the government to close hospitals, direct doctors to practice in certain areas, and facilitate the merger of municipal governments.

Cartography

Geography and environment

 
 Brown, Ron,Top 100 Unusual Things to See in Ontario (2007) excerpt and text search
 
 
 
 
 Freeman, Neil B. The Politics of Power: Ontario Hydro and its Government, 1906–1995 (1996)
 
 
 MacPherson, Allen. Ontario Provincial Parks Trail Guide (2005)briefly describes the 325 interpretive and hiking trails found in 86 operating Ontario Provincial Parks excerpt and text search
 
 Nelles, H. V. The Politics of Development: Forests Mines & Hydro-Electric Power in Ontario, 1849–1941 (2005)
 O'Connor, Ryan. The First Green Wave: Pollution Probe and the Origins of Environmental Activism in Ontario. (2015)
 
 Winfield,  Mark S. Blue-Green Province: The Environment and the Political Economy of Ontario (University of British Columbia Press; 2012) 296 pages; environmental policies since 1945

Indigenous peoples

Economy

Agriculture and agricultural products

Labour, trades, and unions

Manufacturing

Transport

Governance and public policy

Education
 Barber, Marilyn. "The Ontario Bilingual Schools Issue: Sources of Conflict," Canadian Historical Review, (1966) 47$3 pp 227–248
 Bedard, George, and Stephen Lawion. "The struggle for power and control: shifting policy-making models and the Harris agenda for education in Ontario." Canadian Public Administration. 43.3 (2000): 241–269. This article provides a theoretical explanation of the models that Ontario public education policy has followed throughout the history of its development. Despite changes in centralization over the years, the article notes that under Harris and his Common Sense Revolution, the education policy system reached unprecedented levels of politicization and centralization. The "administrative agency" model is touted as the traditional model for the public education system. In this context, an examination of the Common Sense Revolution model will help to show whether or not it was a break from the political and policy tradition. The article also provides elucidation on the difference between the neo-conservative and neo-liberal ideological approaches. It concludes that educational policy-making has changed dramatically; although perhaps not solely because of the Common Sense Revolution.
 Croteau, Jean-Philippe. "History of Education in French-Speaking Ontario: A Historiographic Review." Canadian Issues (2014): 23-30 online
 
 
 
 Gidney, R.D.  "From Hope to Harris: The Reshaping of Ontario Schools." Toronto: University of Toronto Press, 1999. This book chronicles the Ontario education system from the mid-century royal commission, chaired by Justice John Andre Hope that set the post-war educational landscape, to the changes presented by the Harris government at the end of the century. Gidney presents these two points as his beginning and conclusion while describing all the educational developments in between these two eras of drastic change. Gidney uses this period to present and explain three motifs of focus: governance, educational finance, and curriculum. Rather than focusing on specific issues such as separate school funding and French language schooling, he attempts to explain such issues through the aforementioned overarching general themes that he argues are crucial to understanding the Ontario education system and its intricacies.
 
 
 
 
 
 
 Shapiro, Bernard. "The Public Funding of Private Schools in Ontario: The Setting, Some Arguments, and Some Matters of Belief." Canadian Journal of Education. 11:3 (1986): 264–77. In this article, Bernard Shapiro provides a description of the debate surrounding public funding of private schools in Ontario. He presents the three main arguments of both those in favour and those against public funding for private schools. The arguments of the former camp are as follows: First, parents should have the right to choose the best education environment for their children. Second, it is discriminatory to fund catholic schools and no others and third, parents who send their children to private school should not have to pay taxes for public schools. The counter arguments presented against these points deal with: The financial constraint of the province, the issue of a growth of population segregation, and that it denies equality of education by creating a two-tier education system. Shapiro offers an in-depth analysis of these issues presenting supporting points for both camps. This analysis as examined through a set of personal beliefs as to what education should represent, Shapiro concludes with his own argument that Ontario should modify its current arrangements with regards to private schools. 
 
 Stamp, Robert M. The schools of Ontario, 1876–1976 (University of Toronto Press, 1982)
 Stamp, Robert M. "The Historical Background to Separate Schools in Ontario." (Toronto: Ministry of Education, 1985.) This book provides a historical background of separate schools in Ontario. It outlines a chronological table of the development of separate schools beginning with the 1841 act which established "common schools" for those of a different faith. It lists several other acts, notable developments and their significance to the issue. The list concludes with a 1984 statement made by Premier Davis, which establishes full funding for Catholic schools through grade 13. In addition to this list, the book provides a narrative account of significant issues and the development of the separate school system during this period.
  Examines the issue of separate school funding in Ontario as a question of balancing community and individual rights and the obligation the province has in finding an equilibrium between maintaining its liberal institutions and supporting the rights of those cultural groups affected by the status quo. Article proposes a solution to balance these issues in Ontario while offering an argument in support of funding for faith-based schools based on the notion of the right to culture for minority groups.
 Zinga, Dawn. "Ontario's Challenge: Denominational Rights in Public Education." Canadian Journal of Educational Administration and Policy. 80 (2008). In this article, Dawn Zinga discusses the separate schooling issue and the challenge it presents towards denominational rights. Zinga structures this paper through a focus of three areas. It begins with a description of how Catholic schools came to be publicly funded in Ontario. Zinga then examines how Ontario has dealt with the issue of denominational rights in education and looks at what other challenges Ontario faces given the change of Canadian society since confederation. Through these areas of focus the issue is examined both from a historical perspective and as a current political issue with particular focus on the influence of the issue during the 2007 election. Concludes with the idea that it is up to the province going forward and any changes to the educational system will depend on how Ontario chooses to address this issue.

Social welfare
 
  An analysis of workfare as implemented in Ontario after the Conservative victory in 1995. Looks at welfare reform under the Liberal and NDP governments, compares the Liberal's Red Book to the Conservative's Common Sense Revolution and what they meant for the 1995 election, and finally examines the effect of workfare in Ontario post-election. Concludes that workfare does not do much more than create obligatory tasks for welfare dependents. Instead, it helps dismantle 'big' government and the social services it provides, all to the benefit of corporations and the wealthy.
  Provides in-depth account of moral regulations of OMA recipients.  Traces the origins of the program, its implementation and administration. Argues that it was created with the classist, racist, gendered ideology of the middle-class men and women. Looks at the role of maternal ideology in debates around mother's allowance. In contrast to Andrew, argues that women had influence in the administration of the state policy. The U.S. and Canadian provinces already had a similar policy in action. Women could vote for the first time, so Drury's Conservative government wanted to secure that vote by implementing mother's allowance. State took responsibility of moral control of its citizens by strict eligibility criteria of the OMA. While some aspects of the welfare state became routinized and bureaucratized, it remained to be highly subjective. Sexual life, personal hygiene, housekeeping, race/ethnicity of the applicants were under scrutiny by the citizens and the government officials. At the same time, family violence and women's health were rarely considered.

Society

General

Language

Religion

General
 
  Examines the issue of separate school funding in Ontario as a question of balancing community and individual rights and the obligation the province has in finding an equilibrium between maintaining its liberal institutions and supporting the rights of those cultural groups affected by the status quo. Article proposes a solution to balance these issues in Ontario while offering an argument in support of funding for faith-based schools based on the notion of the right to culture for minority groups.

Catholicism

Protestantism
 
 
  Studies families in Ontario.
 
  Focuses heavily on the journey of Anabaptists and other religious non-conformists from Pennsylvania to Upper Canada in the early 19th century.

Race and ethnicity

Black and African

English

  An overview of the Petworth Emigration Scheme.

Finnish

German

 
 
 
 
 
  Discusses the German origins of a number of settlers in Upper Canada.

Italian

Irish

Others
 
 
  Focus is on post-WWII.

Immigration
  An overview of the Petworth Emigration Scheme.

Women and gender

 
 
 
 
 
 
 
 
  Provides in-depth account of moral regulations of OMA recipients.  Traces the origins of the program, its implementation and administration. Argues that it was created with the classist, racist, gendered ideology of the middle-class men and women. Looks at the role of maternal ideology in debates around mother's allowance. In contrast to Andrew, argues that women had influence in the administration of the state policy. The U.S. and Canadian provinces already had a similar policy in action. Women could vote for the first time, so Drury's Conservative government wanted to secure that vote by implementing mother's allowance. State took responsibility of moral control of its citizens by strict eligibility criteria of the OMA. While some aspects of the welfare state became routinized and bureaucratized, it remained to be highly subjective. Sexual life, personal hygiene, housekeeping, race/ethnicity of the applicants were under scrutiny by the citizens and the government officials. At the same time, family violence and women's health were rarely considered.

Death and burial

Sports

Local and regional

Northern Ontario

Southern Ontario

Niagara Region

Eastern Ontario

Southwestern Ontario

Grey County

Waterloo Region

Wellington County

Ontario to 1869
  Careless, J. M. S. Brown of the Globe (2 vols, Toronto, 1959–63), vol 1: The Voice of Upper Canada 1818–1859; vol 2: The Statesman of Confederation 1860–1880.
 
 Craig, Gerald M Upper Canada: the formative years 1784–1841 McClelland and Stewart, 1963, the standard history online edition
 Craven, Paul, ed. Labouring Lives: Work and Workers in Nineteenth-Century Ontario (University of Toronto Press, 1995)
 Dunham, Eileen Political unrest in Upper Canada 1815–1836 McClelland and Stewart, 1963.
 Errington, Jane The Lion, the Eagle, and Upper Canada: A Developing Colonial Ideology McGill-Queen's University Press, 1987.
 
 Forkey, Neil. Shaping the Upper Canadian Frontier: Environment, Society and Culture in the Trent Valley (2003)
 Gidney, R. D. and Millar, W. P. J.  Professional Gentlemen: The Professions in Nineteenth-Century Ontario. U. of Toronto Press, 1994.
 Grabb, Edward, James Curtis, Douglas Baer; "Defining Moments and Recurring Myths: Comparing Canadians and Americans after the American Revolution" The Canadian Review of Sociology and Anthropology, Vol. 37, 2000
 
 Johnson, J. K. and Wilson, Bruce G., eds.  Historical Essays on Upper Canada: New Perspectives. Carleton U. Press, (1975). 604 pp.
 Keane, David and Read, Colin, ed.  Old Ontario: Essays in Honour of J. M. S. Careless. Toronto: Dundurn, 1990.
 Kilbourn, William.; The Firebrand: William Lyon Mackenzie and the Rebellion in Upper Canada (1956) online edition
 Knowles, Norman.  Inventing the Loyalists: The Ontario Loyalist Tradition and the Creation of Usable Pasts. U. of Toronto Press, 1997. 244 pp.
 Landon, Fred, and J.E. Middleton. Province of Ontario: A History (1937) 4 vol. with 2 vol of history and 2 vol. of biographies
 
 
 
 McNairn, Jeffrey L The capacity to judge: public opinion and deliberative democracy in Upper Canada 1791–1854 (U of Toronto Press, 2000).
 
 Moorman, David T. "Where are the English and the Americans in the Historiography of Upper Canada?" Ontario History 88 (1996): 65–9; claims they have been deliberately left out by historians
 
 Noel, S. J. R. Patrons, Clients, Brokers: Ontario Society and Politics, 1791–1896 (1990)
 Oliver, Peter.  "Terror to Evil-Doers": Prisons and Punishments in Nineteenth-Century Ontario. (U. of Toronto Press, 1998). 575 pp.  post 1835
 Rea, J. Edgar.  "Rebellion in Upper Canada, 1837" Manitoba Historical Society Transactions Series 3, Number 22, 1965–66, historiography online edition
 Reid, Richard M.  The Upper Ottawa Valley to 1855. Champlain Soc., 1990. 354 pp.
 Rogers, Edward S. and Smith, Donald B., eds.  Aboriginal Ontario: Historical Perspectives on the First Nations. Dundurn, 1994. 448 pp.
 Styran, Roberta M. and Taylor, Robert R., ed.  The "Great Swivel Link": Canada's Welland Canal. Champlain Soc., 2001. 494 pp.
 
 Wilton, Carol. Popular Politics and Political Culture in Upper Canada, 1800–1850. McGill-Queen's University Press, (2000). 311pp

Ontario since 1869
 
 A. Brady. "The Ontario Hydro-Electric Power Commission". The Canadian Journal of Economics and Political Science. 2:3 (1936): 331–353. An account of the creation of the Ontario Hydro-Electric Power Commission.
 A. Lennox Stanton. "The Hydro-Electric Power Commission of Ontario". Journal of the Royal Society of Arts. 77:4013 (1929) 1115–1130. An examination of the social and political context of the Hydro-Electric Power Commission.
 Azoulay, Dan.  Keeping the Dream Alive: The Survival of the Ontario CCF/NDP, 1950–1963. McGill-Queen's U. Press, 1997. 307 pp.
 
 Cameron, David R. and White, Graham.  Cycling into Saigon: The Conservative Transition in Ontario. U. of British Columbia Press, 2000. 224 pp. Analysis of the 1995 transition from New Democratic Party (NDP) to Progressive Conservative (PC) rule in Ontario
 
 
 Caroline Andrew. "Women and the Welfare State". Canadian Journal of Political Science 17: 4, (1984):667-683. Challenges one-sided male domination approach to studying social policy by arguing that women played an active positive role in the shift from the private sector to the welfare state in Ontario.  Looks at how social and economic contexts such as industrialization, urbanization and immigration led to increase concerns and anxieties about the future of the society.  The industrialization created two classes of women: working and middle class. The political discourse of the time put women in the center of family. Middle-class women followed that discourse and through their gender and class loyalty fought for improved living (and to lesser extent working) conditions of other women, and pressured for government activity. Argues that women as workers for the state had limited influence in state services; women as clients comprise the largest group of recipients whose needs were rarely meet by the state programs. 
 Chenier, Elise Rose. Strangers in Our Midst: Sexual Deviancy in Post-war Ontario (2008)
 Comacchio, Cynthia R.  Nations Are Built of Babies: Saving Ontario's Mothers and Children, 1900–1940. McGill-Queen's U. Press, 1993. 390 pp.
  Cook, Sharon Anne.  "Through Sunshine and Shadow": The Woman's Christian Temperance Union, Evangelicalism, and Reform in Ontario, 1874–1930. McGill-Queen's U. Press, 1995. 281 pp.
  Christopher Armstrong, H.V. Nelles. "Private Property in Peril: Ontario Businessmen and the Federal System". The Business History Review.47:2 (1973): 1898–1911. A discussion of institutional frameworks and resource development. 
 Darroch, Gordon and Soltow, Lee.  Property and Inequality in Victorian Ontario: Structural Patterns and Cultural Communities in the 1871 Census. U. of Toronto Press, 1994. 280 pp.
 Devlin, John F.  "A Catalytic State? Agricultural Policy in Ontario, 1791–2001."  PhD dissertation U. of Guelph 2004. 270 pp. DAI 2005 65(10): 3972-A. DANQ94970 Fulltext: in ProQuest Dissertations & Theses
 Rand Dyck. "The provincial perspectives." Canadian Annual Review of Politics and Public Affairs 1990. Edited by David Leyton-Brown. Toronto:University of Toronto Press, 1997. The Canadian Annual Review of Politics and Public Policy provides a general outline the major political events that took place in provincial politics in 1990.
 E. B. Biggar. "The Ontario Power Commission: Its Origin and Development". Journal of Political Economy. 29:1 (1921): 29–54. An account of the creation of the Ontario Power Commission.
 Evans, A. Margaret.  Sir Oliver Mowat. U. of Toronto Press, 1992. 438 pp.  Premier 1872–1896
 Fleming, Keith R.  Power at Cost: Ontario Hydro and Rural Electrification, 1911–1958. McGill-Queen's U. Press, 1992. 326 pp.
 Pierre Fortin. "The Great Canadian Slump." Canadian Journal of Economics. 29:4 (1996):761-787. This article in the Canadian Journal of Economics explains the effects of the recession in the early 1990s.
 Fred P. Morrissey. "An Appraisal of the Hydro-Electric Power Commission of Ontario". Land Economics. 27:1 (1951) 49–57. An examination of the financial aspects and implications of the Hydro-Electric Power Commission.
 Gidney, R. D.  From Hope to Harris: The Reshaping of Ontario's Schools. U. of Toronto Press, 1999. 362 pp.  deals with debates and changes in education from 1950 to 2000
 
 
 Harold S. Patton. "Hydro-Electric Power Policies in Ontario and Quebec". The Journal of Land & Public Utility Economics. 3:2 (1927) 132–144. A discussion of the initial motives behind the establishment of the hydro-electric power policies of Ontario and Quebec.
 Jim Henderson. "The 1990 Ontario Election: Lessons for Canadians." Canadian Parliamentary Review. 14:1 (1991):24-25. This article explains David Peterson's loss in popularity leading up to the 1990 election.
 Hines, Henry G.  East of Adelaide: Photographs of Commercial, Industrial and Working-Class Urban Ontario, 1905–1930. London Regional Art and History Museum, 1989.
 Hodgetts, J. E.  From Arm's Length to Hands-On: The Formative Years of Ontario's Public Service, 1867–1940. U. of Toronto Press, 1995. 296 pp.
  Irene M. Biss. "The Contracts of the Hydro-Electric Power Commission of Ontario". The Economic Journal. 46:183 (1936): 549–554. Examines the contracts within the Hydro-Electric Power Commission of Ontario.
  James Struthers."The limits of affluence: Welfare in Ontario, 1920–1970". Toronto: University of Toronto Press, 1994. Argues that the concept of motherhood was central in creating Ontario welfare state. Highlights the important role leaders of the orphanages and child welfare advocates played in creation of OMA, (such as Kelso and Bryce). Overcrowding and high death rates were prominent within these institutions, while poverty pushed many working mothers to give their children away. World War I provided political context for mobilizing government, as new citizens were needed. While Canadian Patriotic Fund served as a guideline for OMA, characterized by strict supervision, work with local communities and absence of stigma of charity.  Out of moral concerns, women leaders were the most forceful advocates to limit financial assistance to widows only.  After implementation, municipalities and counties were responsible for half of the cost so they had some influence on OMA Commission. However, the commission only considered their advice on the matters of potential "unworthiness" of the client. Justified in the interests of the children and rhetoric of motherhood as a service to the state, the program was never sufficient enough to alleviate poverty for even most deserving mothers, subordinating women only further by constant surveillance and threat. 
  John Ibbitson.  Promised Land: Inside the Mike Harris Revolution. Toronto: Prentice-Hall, 1997. Tracks the political ascent of Harris, the beginnings of the neo-liberal revolution that was beginning within the Tories that allowed Harris to beat out the more moderate members for the leadership, and how those ideologies became popular in reaction to the Rae government.
  Karl Froschauer. "Ontario's Niagara Falls, 1887–1929: Reversing the Privatization of Hydro". Journal of Canadian Studies. 39:3(2005): 60–84. Examines the issues which led to the reversing of privatized hydro.
 
 Keil, Roger. ""Common-Sense"Neoliberalism: Progressive Conservative Urbanism in Toronto, Canada." Antipode.(2002): 578–598. Print. Surmises how Toronto neo-liberalism affected the Harris government 
 Keith R. Fleming. "Power at Cost: Ontario Hydro and Rural Electrification, 1911–1958". Montreal: McGill-Queen's University Press, 1992.  A study on the development of the HEPC inrural Ontario.
 Thomas Klassen and Dan Buchanan. "Ideology, Policy and Economy: Liberal, New Democratic and Conservative Reforms to Ontario's Welfare Program." Journal of Canadian Studies. 40:3 (2006):186-210. This article analyzes the changes in Ontario's welfare policies under the Liberal, New Democratic and Conservatives governments since 1985.
 Kozolanka, Kirsten. The Power of Persuasion: The Politics of the New Right in Ontario (2006)
 Krajnc, Anita. "Wither Ontario's Environment? Neo-Conservatism and the Decline of the Environment Ministry." Canadian Public Policy. 26.1 (2000): 111–127. The article provides a treatment of environmental policy reform resulting from the Common Sense Revolution but focuses specifically on the budget cuts to the Ontario Ministry of Environment. It attempts to track the level of funding and staffing since the MOE's inception in the 1970s, reviews the impacts of the cuts that occurred in the mid-90s, and theorizes which forces were the most pervasive in causing its decline. Though the article examines the effect of party politics, public pressures, and other socio-political forces, it concludes that the primary cause of the decline was the ideology underlying the Common Sense Revolution. This article concerns itself with "neo-conservatism" instead of the "neo-liberalism" mentioned by Olakanmi, Prudham, Little, etc. The Common Sense Revolution resulted in far-reaching changes to traditional environmental policy and the primary mobilizing factor was this ideology.
  Kushner, Joseph, and David Siegel."Citizen's Attitudes Toward Municipal Amalgamation in Three Ontario Municipalities." Canadian Journal of Regional Science. 26.1(2003): 49–59. Examines the results of Toronto Amalgamation. 
 Landon, Fred, and J.E. Middleton. Province of Ontario: A History (1937) 4 vol. with 2 vol of biographies
 Little, Margaret. "A Closer Look at the Neo-Liberal Petri Dish: Welfare Reform in British Columbia and Ontario." Canadian Review of Social Policy. 57. (2006): 16–45. The article compares and contrasts the instances of neo-liberal governments in British Columbia and Ontario and their respective approaches towards welfare policy. Though the article is not specifically focused on whether or not the Common Sense Revolution was a break from tradition, it does provide pertinent information. It notes that, the emphasis on "workfare" was an ideological and philosophical approach to welfare policy that was brand new to Ontario. In addition, the obsession with welfare fraud prevention was a significant change to past practices. The article notes the almost impossible amount of detail required to prove need and emphasizes that the moral element of making certain that no one could gain the system was also new to Ontario policy-making. The article concludes that Common Sense Revolution did not only feature a new ideological approach to Ontario politics but also represented a stricter form of moral policing especially with regard to welfare policy.
 MacDermid, Robert. "TV Advertising in the 1995 Ontario Election." Revolution at Queen's Park: Essays on Governing Ontario. Ed. Sid Noel. Toronto: J Lorimer, 1997., pp. 1–17. Argues that the planning that the Tories took on for the implementation of their advertising campaign laid the groundwork fortheir victory.
 Manthorpe, Jonathan. The power & the Tories: Ontario politics, 1943 to the present (1974) 
  Margaret Little. "The Blurring of Boundaries: Private and Public Welfare for Single Mothers in Ontario". Studies in Political Economy: 47:07 (1995): 89-109. Argues that Ontario state policies grew out of private welfare activities and at the early stage even relied on the private agencies to help the government in administration of the OMA.  States that, while liberal democratic states adhere to strict division between private and public realms and do not interfere with the former, Ontario government with the help and active participation of voluntary organizations facilitated in internalization of the maternal ideology by the citizens.  This allowed government to control the impoverished women, by relaying on the opinions and experience of organizations such as Children's Aid Society, National Council of Women and Toronto Local Council of Women in administering and delivering state services.
  Provides in-depth account of moral regulations of OMA recipients.  Traces the origins of the program, its implementation and administration. Argues that it was created with the classist, racist, gendered ideology of the middle-class men and women. Looks at the role of maternal ideology in debates around mother's allowance. In contrast to Andrew, argues that women had influence in the administration of the state policy. The U.S. and Canadian provinces already had a similar policy in action. Women could vote for the first time, so Drury's Conservative government wanted to secure that vote by implementing mother's allowance. State took responsibility of moral control of its citizens by strict eligibility criteria of the OMA. While some aspects of the welfare state became routinized and bureaucratized, it remained to be highly subjective. Sexual life, personal hygiene, housekeeping, race/ethnicity of the applicants were under scrutiny by the citizens and the government officials. At the same time, family violence and women's health were rarely considered.
 
  Merrill Denison. "The People's Power; the History of Ontario Hydro". Toronto: McClelland & Stewart Limited, 1960. Looks at public ownership of hydroelectric power in Ontario.
 Montgomery, Byron. "The common (non)sense revolution : the decline of progress and democracy in Ontario". Creemore: Mad River Publishing, 2002. The book provides a highly detailed and critical treatment of the Common Sense Revolution and the magnitude of its reforms across many policy areas including public education, healthcare, etc. The writing on healthcare is timely given the Harris government's promise that there would be no cuts to it and the author's explanation of the Health Services Restructuring Commission. The book concludes by accusing the Revolution and its supporters of attempting to weaken government such that it was incapable of exerting influence; that Mike Harris and his supporters did not govern for the people and changed too much too quickly.
  Montigny, Edgar-Andre, and Lori Chambers, eds. Ontario since Confederation: A Reader (University of Toronto Press, 2000).
  Moss, Mark.  Manliness and Militarism: Educating Young Boys in Ontario for War. (Oxford U. Press, 2001). 216 pp.
 
 Neil B. Freeman. "The Politics of Power: Ontario Hydro and Its Government 1906–1995". Toronto: University of Toronto Press, 1996. Examines the relationship between the government and the Ontario Hydro-Electric Power Commission. 
 Neil B. Freeman. "The Politics of Power: Ontario Hydro and its Government 1906–1995". Toronto:University of Toronto Press, 1996. Outlines the relationship between Ontario Hydro and the provincial government.
 Nesbitt-Larking, Paul. "Political Psychology in Canada". Political Psychology. 25.1 (2004): 97–114. Defines and compares Canadian political psychology. 
 Christopher Olakanmi. "Disaster Capitalism and the Common Sense Revolution: Taking Stock of the Residual Crisis in Ontario's Public Schools." Our Schools, Our Selves. 17:3 (2008): 61–71. Examines the motivation and long-term results of the Common Sense Revolution on Ontario public Schools. 
 Olakanmi, Christopher. "Disaster Capitalism and the Common Sense Revolution: Taking Stock of the Residual Crisis in Ontario's Public Schools." Our Schools, Ourselves. 17.3 (2008): 67–71. This article examines the effects that the Common Sense Revolution had on several social institutions including the public education system. The article notes the neo-liberal foundations of the Revolution and that Mike Harris deliberately promoted "disaster capitalism" to impact policy. Particular emphasis is placed on the effect of neo-liberal doctrines and thinkers on the large-scale changes that occurred with regards to public education policy. The article is critical of the changes and argues that neo-liberal ideology has damaged unions, the school boards, and led to dramatic underfunding; it concludes, however, that a change in ideology could see positive reforms to public education. Examines the effect of the CSR on Ontario's public school system, a decade after it was implemented. While most PC policies were neo-liberal (which generally holds that education should be as privatized as possible, albeit with government funding), their approach to education involved more regulation of schools, including administrative, curricular, and working conditions, while reducing the amount of money spend. This could be considered an attempt to reduce the power of public unions, of which teachers are among the most visible and influential. "Consequently, it carried out a strategic plan to undermine the authority, knowledge, and integrity of those within the education system in order to further its agenda. 
 Ontario Bureau of Statistics and Research. A Conspectus of the Province of Ontario (1947) online edition
 Jerry Paquette. "Cross-purposes and crossed wires in education policymaking on equity: The Ontario experiences, 1990–1995." Journal of Curriculum Studies. 33:1 (2001):89-112. In his article Jerry Paquette examines the NDP government from 1990 to 1995 in regards to its education policy.
 
  W.R. Plewman. "Adam Beck and the Ontario Hydro". Toronto: The Ryerson Press, 1947. A description of Adam Beck's roll in various Ontarian governments.
 Prudham, Scott. "Poisoning the well: neoliberalism and the contamination of municipal water in Walkerton, Ontario." Geoforum. 35.3 (2004): 343–359. This article places its emphasis on Common Sense Revolution environmental policy and explores the Walkerton Tragedy within the context of this policy. Justification for this focus is provided through the article's showing that much of the Revolution was nature-centered. Though the Harris cuts were building on the cuts by the Rae government, they went far deeper and damaged many core programs; in addition, the Harris cuts were motivated primarily by an ideology that was new to Ontario governance. The combination of policy like the Red Tape Reduction Bill with the immense cuts and the rhetorical attacks against the public sector produced a never-before-seen devolution in environmental oversight. The article concludes by reiterating that the Common Sense Revolution directly gave rise to the conditions that allowed the Walkerton Tragedy to occur.
  Ralph, Diana; Régimbald, André; and St-Amand, Nérée, eds.  Open for Business, Closed for People: Mike Harris's Ontario. Fernwood, 1997. 207 pp.
 Ralph, Diana, Andre Regimbald, and Neree St. Amand. Open for business: closed to people: Mike Harris's Ontario. Halifax: Fernwood Publishing, 1997. The book provides a chronological overview of key events during the Common Sense Revolution as well as contextual explanations for these events. The authors argue throughout that there was a multinational, corporate agenda underlying Mike Harris' policies; a factor that had never been so pronounced in Ontario policymaking. Although the book touches on similar subjects to the other presented sources, it also offers unique points. For example, it notes that, there has been a tradition in Ontario of legislation combatting racism and anti-Semitism since the 40s, but that the Common Sense Revolution represented a break from this due to the elimination of various pieces of equity legislation. The book ultimately argues that the underlying sociology of the Revolution and its emphasis on a new, business-like model of government produced massive changes in many different parts of Ontario policymaking. Examines how the CSR was designed by, and heavily favours, corporations instead of people. Discusses, in three sections, the routes of the revolution in Thatcherism and American conservatism; the impact it has had on the province including social programs, Franco-Ontarians, and labour organizations; and ways in which opponents can respond to the government. 
 Reginald Pelham Bolton. "An Expensive Experiment: The Hydro-Electric Power Commission of Ontario". New York: The Baker & Taylor Company, 1913. An examination of public rights and resource development in Canada.
 
 Royal Commission on Electrical Power Planning. "The Report of the Royal Commission on Electric Power Planning". Toronto: The Royal Commission on Electric Power Planning, 1980. A commission produced report explaining the goals and criteria of the Hydro-Electric Power Commission of Ontario.
 
 Saywell, John T.  "Just Call Me Mitch": The Life of Mitchell F. Hepburn. U. of Toronto Press, 1991. 637 pp.  Biography of Liberal premier 1934–1942
  Focus is on post-WWII.
 Schull, Joseph. Ontario since 1867 (1978), narrative history
 S. Conway. "The Politics of Electricity in Ontario". Current Affairs:Perspectives on Electricity Policy for Ontario. Edited by D. Reeve, D.N. Dewees, & B. Karney. Toronto: University of Toronto Press, 2010. A short chapter regarding hydro-electric power and Ontario's political culture.
 Smith, Edward. "Working-Class Anglicans: Religion and Identity in Victorian and Edwardian Hamilton, Ontario," Social History/Histoire Sociale, 2003 online edition
 Stagni, Pellegrino.  The View from Rome: Archbishop Stagni's 1915 Reports on the Ontario Bilingual Schools Question McGill-Queen's U. Press, 2002. 134 pp.
 Warecki, George M.  Protecting Ontario's Wilderness: A History of Changing Ideas and Preservation Politics, 1927–1973. Lang, 2000. 334 pp.
 White, Graham, ed.  The Government and Politics of Ontario. 5th ed. U. of Toronto Press, 1997. 458 pp.
 White, Randall.  Ontario since 1985. Eastendbooks, 1998. 320 pp.
 Wilson, Barbara M. ed. Ontario and the First World War, 1914–1918: A Collection of Documents (Champlain Society, 1977)
 Winfield, Mark, and Greg Jenish. "Ontario's Environment and the "Common Sense Revolution". Studies in Political Economy. 57. (1998): 129–147. An overview of the effect that the "Common Sense Revolution" has had on environmental protection and natural resource policy in Ontario. Particular emphasis is placed on the numerous provincial statute amendments, the sharp reductions in budget, and the governmental restructuring that occurred. The article is critical of the changes propagated by the Revolution and concludes that it has reversed two long-standing traditions of Ontario policy; dedication to environmental protection and resource conservation, and reduction of economic reliance on natural resource mining.
 D, Gagan. "For patients of moderate means: a social history of the voluntary public general hospital in Canada 1890–1950". Montreal: McGill-Queen's University Press, 2002
 N, Hillmer. "Pearson the unlikely gladiator". Montreal: Montreal: McGill-Queen's University Press, 1999
 D, Naylor. "Canadian health care and the states: a century of evolution". Montreal: McGill-Queen's University Press, 1992
 K.C, Harvey. "Ontario Health Insurance Plan". British Medical Journal, 1978
 R, Graham. "Old man Ontario: Leslie M. Frost". Toronto: University of Toronto Press for the Ontario Historical Studies Series, 1990
 C.D, Naylor. "Private practice, public payment: Canadian medicine and the politics of health insurance, 1911–1966". Kingston: McGill-Queen's University Press, 1986

Recent politics
 Christina Blizzard, Right Turn: How the Tories took Ontario. (Toronto: Dundurn Press, 1995.)  An account of the 1995 Ontario Provincial election and the Progressive-Conservative Party's rise to power, with a focus on the re-branding of the Ontario PC party under the party leadership of Mike Harris and the impact of the Common Sense Revolution campaign platform. The account details the unique circumstances in Ontario which enabled the OntarioPC party to rise from a third party and seize majority government victory.
 John Ibbitson. Promised Land: Inside the Mike Harris Revolution (Scarborough: Prentice Hall Canada Inc, 1997.) Promised Land is divided into two parts with the first being an examination of the how the Common Sense Revolution was constructed and the people involved in its conception.  Attention is put on the evolution of the Ontario PC Party under Mike Harris's leadership and the influences and circumstances which became responsible for the policies outlined in the CommonSense Revolution.  The second part of Promised Land examines the Ontario PC Party after they had one majority government in 1995 with attention on the consequences of instituting the CommonSense Revolution in Ontario and the impact it had on various segments of society.  Focus is put on the protest by certain segments of society, such as labour and the teachers union, towards the policies introduced by the Harris government and how the government confronted and overcame these challenges.
 Rosemary Speirs. Out of the Blue: The Fall of the Tory Dynasty in Ontario (Toronto: Macmillan, 1986.)  An examination of the decline of the Progressive-Conservative party in Ontario and an analysis of the party's fall from power beginning with the resignation of Bill Davis in 1985 and his government's defeat in the 1985 election subsequently giving way to the emergence of David Peterson's Liberal government.  Attention is put on how the Ontario PC Party managed itself in those wilderness years as the Liberals and NDP increasingly seized and divided political control of Ontario.  Further analysis covers the party's innerdivisiveness as it struggled to reinvent itself and renew its position within Ontario politics.
 Sid Noel, ed. Revolution at Queens Park: Essays on Governing Ontario (Toronto: James Lorimer and Company, 1997). A collection of essays examining the dramatic political shift Ontario has experienced since 1985 by putting attention on the 1995 election and the circumstances which resulted in a"revolution in Queens Park" via Mike Harris's conservative government winning a majority.  The essays present new perspectives on how aspects of the election such as media, political culture as well as economics played a crucial role in determining the end results.

Bob Rae
 Bob Rae. "From Protest to Power: Personal Reflections on a life in politics". Middlesex: Penguin Book Ltd, 1996. This is a book written as an autobiography by Bob Rae outlining his life in politics. The book starts off with an introduction briefly describing Mr. Rae's first year as premier. Throughout the book he discusses the trials and tribulations that he had to endure and overcome as premier, including the recession in Ontario in the late 1980s and early 1990s, his party politics, and issues with Quebec independence sentiments. The book discusses how Bob Rae got into politics and a brief history of his childhood. Rae goes through each of his elections in the 80s and 90s. He describes the outcomes of each election and the consequence that it had on his life on the path to becoming in NDP Premier in Ontario for the years of 1990 to 95. The book continues to talk about the many major and minor mistakes that his party had made throughout his leadership, such as party members "losing their cool" in parliament or getting a staff member to sign a document on a cabinet member's behalf. The book concludes with Bob Rae talking about how he lost his premier seat to Mike Harris and his congratulation speech.
 Thomas Walkom. "Rae Days". Toronto: Key Porter book Ltd, 1994. A look at the political history of Bob Rae while he was the NDP Premier of Ontario. The book discusses the social reforms under taken by the Rae government, along with other policy changes, such as the auto insurance issue. The book continues to describe Bob Rae as a leader and the decisions he made with his party. Most of these decisions were said by critics to have been Rae's downfall and the NDP's dramatic fall in popularity with the population. The book quickly discusses Rae's personal life as well and describes him as "a liberal in sandals". The book continues to discuss personal and political events through the NDP party starting from winning on election night in 1990.
 Bob Rae. "Lessons to be learned: the report of the Honourable Bob Rae, independent advisor to the minister of public safety and emergency preparedness, on outstanding questions with respect to the bombing of Air India Flight 182". Air India Review Secretariat. Her majesty the Queen in Right of Canada, 2005. This report is a policy-based inquiry into the event of the Air India Flight 182 bombing. The report is written by Bob Rae and takes into consideration the inquiries of the public with respect to the bombing. The report discusses the terrorist group that was behind the bombing and how the bombings took place. The report then goes on to discuss the outcome of the trials for the people responsible for the bombing. A brief history and background outlines a brief history on the turmoils of the Sikh population in Canada and in India and why the Sikh population had wanted to assert themselves as an independent state. There was also an overview as to what the Canadian government should do to correct the situation and to put in place certain policies and procedures. Rae questions the government as to why the events of 9/11 was the catalyst to bringing forth the Anti-Terrorism act instead of the Air India Act that directly affected many Canadian lives on Canadian soil. The report ends off by Rae explaining that further review should be held for questions that still have no answer, for example was the assessment by Canadian government officials in the potential threat of Sikh terrorism in the period prior to 1985 adequate in light of the information reasonably available at the time even though the government received numerous warnings of the activities of this terrorist group. This book is a good review of national security policies and procedures and changes that should occur to the Canadian government.
 Paul Kaihla. "Rating Bob Rae." Maclean's. Volume 104: Issue 34 (1991): 14. This article is a brief overview of the first year of Rae's achievements and setbacks as Premier of Ontario. This is a brief overview of Rae's role in government and how Ontario has changed for the better or worse. Many of the citizens interviewed in the article state that they are still waiting on improvements that were promised to them in the social service sector. The article discusses the slow pace of change and the people's hopes and dreams for change in policies before Rae was elected. So far nothing has come forth yet. The author has stated that Rae has yet to make good on his word to be a more involved politician. Some of the strides made by Rae in politics have been the signing of the letter of agreement stating that the First nation residents shall possess an inherent right to self-government, a first declaration ever made by any Ontario Premier. The article continues to discuss the implications of the recession for the Ontario economy with the lack of jobs that were supposed to be created under the Rae government. The article continues to describe the conflicts in inter party politics and the debate on the auto insurance issue of scrapping the no fault auto insurance plan.
 Paul Kaihla and Ross Laver. "Bob Rae's Revolution" Maclean's. Volume 105: Issue 37 (1992):20 – 24 This article is about the social reform changes that the Rae government had made or tried to make during their rule. The policies that were made during the Rae government that affected social aspects of Ontario were the Consent to treatment act which gave permission to children aged 12 and over to refuse medical treatment without parental consent,  a very progressive labour legislation that would make private companies throughout Ontario hire visible minorities, women and disabled people. The article emphasizes the Rae party's policies to change deep-seated social injustices in Ontario. The article continues to discuss other policies in the labour field and the educational field. The article concludes with the author discussing Rae's commitment to fighting social injustices and changing the power balance in Ontario to giving power to less advantaged people according to race and gender.
  A comparison between Bob Rae's NDP government and Mike Harris's PC government and their policy attitudes towards organized labour in Ontario.  A decade of data ranging from 1987 to 1998 is used to compare the effects of government change over which note the contrasting certification/decertification activity as well as number of complaints regarding unfair labour practices and focus is put on how these issues were significantly impacted with the election of the Ontario PC government in 1995 and remained in sharp contrast throughout the Harris years.  The study the article examines is a reflection of left-right party positions on organized labour which became a major issue of Mike Harris's terms in government.

Mike Harris
 Blizzard, Christina. "Right Turn: How the Tories Took Ontario." Toronto: Dundurn Press, 1995. An in-depth review by a former Toronto Sun reporter on Mike Harris's rise to power in the 1995 election and particularly important issues during the campaign. Argues that Harris did not have any kind of secret American election formula, but instead responded to polling and the fears of Ontarians. 
  Bradford, Neil. "Public-Private Partnership? Shifting Paradigms of Economic Governance in Ontario." Canadian Journal of Political Science. 36.5 (2003): 1005–1033. Print. Compares economic differences between Harris and Raegov ernments.
 Clarkson, Stephen. "Paradigm Shift or Political Correction? Putting Ontario's 'Common Sense Revolution' in a Global Context." Regional and Federal Studies 9.3 (1999): 81-106. An analysis of whether the CSR constitutes a temporary 'correction' to the nature of regional government and economic planning, or if the CSR is a permanent change that would fundamentally alter it. A global trend shows regional level of governments attaining greater economic control away from the national level. Harris fought for greater provincial autonomy, but was disinterested in representing Ontario on a global level and was more inward looking than his predecessors across the spectrum. PC policies such as "the best creation program is a tax cut" have both distinctly neo-liberal and Keynesian characteristics.
 Downey, Terrence J.  "Provincial Agendas, Local Responses: The 'Common Sense' Restructuring of Ontario's Municipal Governments." Canadian Public Administration. 41:2 (1998): 210–238. A study on the results of the PC proposals to restructure six municipalities in southern Ontario. 'Restructuring' has turned a simplistic process of amalgamation and eliminating the new redundancies, and the provincial government failed to adequately work with municipalities, instead implementing some proposals unilaterally. Questions Harris claim that restructuring local government could have an effect on local growth, as if the design of the bureaucracy is more substantial than its policies. The actual implementation of some parts of the plan was forced upon municipalities to take on themselves, and there were varying response ranging from compliance to outright resistance.
 Duchesne, Scott. "Mike the Message: Performing the Common Sense Revolution." Theatre Research in Canada. 20:1 (1999). The article examines the political dimension of how the Common Sense Revolution was promoted and enacted. Particular emphasis is placed on Mike Harris as the catalyst of the reforms and the positive and negative feedback that he and his party received as a result. The article focuses on in-depth analysis of Conservative propaganda commercials and provides insight into how certain wide-scale reforms that diverged from tradition were seemingly accepted by the Ontario population and why policies like Bill 103 were so stringently opposed. The article concludes by noting that Harris' image may have been more damaging to the Revolution than his far-reaching changes to the Ontario policy tradition.
 Felice Martinello. "Mr. Harris, Mr. Rae and Union Activity in Ontario." Canadian Public Policy. 26: 1 (2000):17–33.
 Rapaport, David. No Justice, No Peace: The 1996 OPSEU Strike Against the Harris Government in Ontario (McGill-Queen's Press – MQUP, 1999)
 White, Graham. "The Government and Politics of Ontario". Toronto: University of Toronto Press, 1997.

Media
 
  Careless, J. M. S. Brown of the Globe (2 vols, Toronto, 1959–63), vol 1: The Voice of Upper Canada 1818–1859; vol 2: The Statesman of Confederation 1860–1880.

Primary sources
 Baskerville, Peter, ed. The Upper Ottawa Valley to 1855: A collection of documents (1990)

See also

 Bibliography of Canada
 Bibliography of Canadian history
 Bibliography of Nova Scotia
 Bibliography of Alberta history
 Bibliography of British Columbia
 Bibliography of the 1837–38 insurrections in Lower Canada
 List of books about the War of 1812

 
Ontario